Duplais Balance is a box set by Coil, containing a CD with the track "Animal Are You?", a bottle of absinthe, two glasses and two spoons.

Background
It was first available for preorder in November 2006 and offered for sale in "mid December". The box set was produced in a limited edition of 250.

According to the official merchant, the box set contains the following:
1 Absinthe Duplais Balance 0.5 L – 60% (label design by Peter Christopherson)
2 Absinthe glasses
2 Absinthe spoons
1 Coil CD "Animal Are You?"

Track listing
"Animal Are You?" - 11:39

References

External links
 
 
 Animal Are You? at Brainwashed

2006 compilation albums
Coil (band) compilation albums
Compilation albums published posthumously